Cabaret Voltaire was a one-issue Dadaist art magazine which was published in May 1916 in Zurich, Switzerland. Its subtitle was eine Sammlung künstlerischer und literarischer Beiträge (German: A collection of artistic and literary contributions).

History and profile
Cabaret Voltaire was launched by the German writer Hugo Ball in Zurich and appeared on 31 May 1916. In the magazine Hugo Ball announced the opening of an artistic nightclub with the same name, Cabaret Voltaire. The publisher of the magazine was Julius Heuberger. Its size was 21.5 x 27 cm (8½ x 10½ inches), and it had thirty-two pages. Five hundred copies of the magazine were issued. 

Cabaret Voltaire published articles in French and German. Its format was conventional, and the magazine featured work by the Dadaist, Futurist and Cubist artists. 

The successor of Cabaret Voltaire was Dada, an art and literary review launched by Tristan Tzara.

References

External link
 Digital archive of the magazine, Iowa University Library

1916 establishments in Switzerland
1916 disestablishments in Switzerland
Defunct magazines published in Switzerland
Bilingual magazines
Dada
French-language magazines
German-language magazines
Magazines established in 1916
Magazines disestablished in 1916
Magazines published in Zürich
Visual arts magazines